Lamna is a genus of mackerel sharks in the family Lamnidae, containing two extant species: the porbeagle (L. nasus) of the North Atlantic and Southern Hemisphere, and the salmon shark (L. ditropis) of the North Pacific.

Endothermy
The two species of this genus can keep their blood temperature higher above that of the water surrounding them than other cartilaginous fish, with temperature differences recorded up to 15.6 °C.  Among fish, blood temperature regulation only occurs in large, fast species – bluefin tuna and swordfish are  bony fish  with similar abilities.

Species
 †Lamna attenuata (Davis, 1888)
 †Lamna carinata (Davis, 1888)
 Lamna ditropis C. L. Hubbs & Follett, 1947 (salmon shark)
 †Lamna hectori (Davis, 1888)
 †Lamna marginalis (Davis, 1888)
 Lamna nasus (Bonnaterre, 1788) (porbeagle)
 †Lamna quinquelateralis (Cragin, 1894)
 †Lamna trigeri (Coquand, 1860)
 †Lamna trigonata (Agassiz, 1843)

See also
 List of prehistoric cartilaginous fish

References

 
Danian first appearances
Taxa named by Georges Cuvier
Shark genera
Extant Danian first appearances